Brian Magee (born 9 June 1975) is a Northern Irish former professional boxer who competed from 1999 to 2012. He held the WBA (Regular) super-middleweight title in 2012, and the IBO title from 2001 to 2004. At regional level, he held the British super middleweight title in 2008 and the EBU European title in 2010. As an amateur he represented Ireland at the 1996 Olympics, reaching the middleweight quarter-finals. He also won a silver medal at the 1998 European Championships and bronze at the 1998 Commonwealth Games, representing Northern Ireland in the latter.

Amateur career
As an amateur Magee fought out of holy trinity ABC in Belfast, and won the Ulster senior title every year from 1995 to 1998.

Magee represented Ireland at the 1996 Summer Olympics.

Olympic results 
Defeated Randall Thompson (Canada) 13–5
Defeated Bertrand Tetsia (Cameroon) 11–6
Lost to Mohamed Bahari (Algeria) 9–15

Magee won a bronze medal for Northern Ireland at the 1998 Commonwealth Games and silver medal for Ireland at the 1998 European Championships in Minsk, Belarus.

Professional career
Magee turned professional in March 1999, and fought Dean Ashton at the Bowler's Arena, Manchester, England on the undercard of a bill that included Damaen Kelly, Michael Brodie and Clinton Woods. Magee won his opener knocking out the Stoke man inside two rounds.

He won the vacant IBO Intercontinental super middleweight title in January 2001 by defeating Neil Linford from England. He then won the IBO world super middleweight title and defended it successfully eight times. He was then defeated in his attempt for the European title.  In December 2008 he beat undefeated Scottish Stevie Maguire to win the British super middleweight title, and, after a 13-month break, returned to defeat Mads Larsen in a seven-round knockout in Aarhus, becoming European champion for the first time.

On 11 September 2010 Brian Magee defended his European Title against Armenia's Roman Aramian with the Armenian not starting the ninth round. Magee challenged IBF Super-Middleweight champion Lucian Bute in Canada on 19 March 2011.
He lost the fight to Lucian Bute by TKO in the tenth round.

On 30 July 2011 Magee captured the interim WBA super-middleweight title with a unanimous points win over Jaime Barboza in San Jose, Costa Rica.

Magee vs. Kessler
On 8 December 2012. Brian Magee travelled to Denmark to face "The Viking Warrior" Mikkel Kessler in his home nation with the WBA Super Middleweight Title at stake. After a quiet 1st round, Magee went to the floor twice in the 2nd after Kessler landed some hard bodyshots. After 24 seconds on the third round it was allover, Kessler landed a hard bodyshot again; Magee never recovered and Kessler became World Champion for the fifth time.

Professional boxing record

References

External links
 (archived)

1975 births
Living people
Sportspeople from Lisburn
Male boxers from Northern Ireland
Doping cases in boxing
Middleweight boxers
Commonwealth Games bronze medallists for Northern Ireland
Boxers at the 1998 Commonwealth Games
Boxers at the 1996 Summer Olympics
Olympic boxers of Ireland
Irish male boxers
Commonwealth Games medallists in boxing
European Boxing Union champions
World Boxing Association champions
International Boxing Organization champions
World super-middleweight boxing champions
Southpaw boxers
British Boxing Board of Control champions
Medallists at the 1998 Commonwealth Games